General Barrett may refer to:

Arthur Barrett (Indian Army officer) (1857–1926), British Indian Army general
Charles D. Barrett (1885–1943), U.S. Marine Corps major general
Michael B. Barrett (born c. 1946), U.S. Army brigadier general
Sam C. Barrett (fl. 1980s–2020s), U.S. Air Force lieutenant general

See also
William Cross Barratt (1862–1940), British Army major general
John Davenport Barrette (1862–1934), U.S. Army brigadier general
Luís do Rego Barreto (1777–1840), Kingdom of Portugal lieutenant general
Attorney General Barrett (disambiguation)